Senator Dillon may refer to:

Charles Hall Dillon (1853–1929), South Dakota State Senate
Gary P. Dillon (born 1943), Indiana State Senate
Richard C. Dillon (1877–1966), New Mexico State Senate